Alestramustine, also known as estradiol 3-(bis(2-chloroethyl)carbamate) 17β-(L-alaninate), is a cytostatic antineoplastic agent which was never marketed. It is the L-alanine ester of estramustine, which is a combination of the nitrogen mustard normustine coupled via a carbamate to the estrogen estradiol. Alestramustine acts as a prodrug to estramustine, and also forms estradiol as a byproduct. The drug, via its active metabolites, binds to microtubule-associated proteins and β-tubulin and interferes with microtubule function, thereby inhibiting cell division. Due to its estrogen moiety, alestramustine is selectively concentrated in estrogen receptor-positive cells such as prostate and breast.

See also
 List of hormonal cytostatic antineoplastic agents
 List of estrogen esters § Estradiol esters

References

Abandoned drugs
Antineoplastic drugs
Chloroethyl compounds
Estradiol esters
Estranes
Hormonal antineoplastic drugs
Nitrogen mustards
Organochlorides
Prodrugs
Synthetic estrogens